Mountains and Rivers Without End is an epic poem by American poet and essayist Gary Snyder. Snyder began writing the thirty-nine poems contained in the epic in 1956 and published the final version in 1996.  The work is divided into four parts, each exploring a different theme.

References

Further reading

External links
 Mountains and Rivers Without End, read by the author.  Smithsonian Institution, Washington, D.C.

nn

American poems